Nemapogon picarella, the pied clothes moth, is a moth of the family Tineidae. It was described by Carl Alexander Clerck in 1759. It is found in most of Europe, except Ireland, the Benelux, the Iberian Peninsula and the Balkan Peninsula.

The wingspan is 12–19 mm. Adults are black and white. They are on wing from June to July.

Larvae have been recorded feeding on bracket fungus (including Piptoporus betulinus) and dead wood.

Etymology
The species name is derived from Latin Pica (meaning magpie) and refers to the pied appearance of the adults.

References

Moths described in 1759
Moths of Europe
Nemapogoninae
Taxa named by Carl Alexander Clerck